Zagurski is the phonetically transcribed Polish surname Zagórski. Notable people with the surname include:

Mike Zagurski (born 1983), American baseball player
Walter Zagurski (1911–1959), Lithuanian-born American weightlifter

Polish-language surnames